Jean Remington Yawkey (January 24, 1909 – February 26, 1992) was the wife of Tom Yawkey and owner of the Boston Red Sox from 1976 to her death in 1992.

Biography
Jean Yawkey was born Jean Hollander in Brooklyn, New York. She grew up in Freeport, Long Island, and was a New York City fashion model for ten years. In December 1944, she married Tom Yawkey in Georgetown, South Carolina; both had previous marriages that ended in divorce. During World War II, she was active with the Red Cross.

Tom Yawkey had bought the Boston Red Sox in 1933. Following his death in 1976, Jean Yawkey was chairwoman of the board of directors of the JRY Corporation, the majority owner and general partner of the Red Sox, until her death.

In 1983, Jean Yawkey became a director of the National Baseball Hall of Fame and Museum in Cooperstown, New York, holding the distinction of being the first woman elected to the board.

In 1992, Jean Yawkey died in Boston at age 83. In total, the Yawkeys owned (solely, or with partners) and operated the team for 59 years. Jean Yawkey was inducted to the Boston Red Sox Hall of Fame in 1995.

Philanthropy

Jean Yawkey had a long association with the Jimmy Fund/Dana–Farber Cancer Institute as a trustee and for a period as chair. She was a supporter of the Tara Hall Home for Boys in South Carolina. She was instrumental in the establishment of the Yawkey Family Inn in Brookline, Massachusetts, a temporary home for families of patients undergoing transplant surgery in Boston-area hospitals. She was also a trustee of Yawkey Foundation I.

Jean Yawkey and the Yawkey Foundations established scholarship funds at Yale University, Boston College, and Boston College High School. She was a supporter of the Jackie Robinson Scholarship Program and supported several other educational institutions to provide minority students and others with scholarship aid.

In 2003, the Yawkey Foundation awarded $5 million to Emmanuel College in Boston for construction of the Jean Yawkey Center, a student center, dining hall, gym and fitness center.

Boston Red Sox
The team's most successful season during Jean Yawkey's ownership came in 1986, when the Red Sox reached the World Series, losing in seven games to the New York Mets.

References

Further reading 
 
 "Milestones, Jan. 8, 1945: Married. Thomas Austin Yawkey", Time magazine, Monday, Jan. 08, 1945

External links
Yawkey Foundations web site

1909 births
1992 deaths
Major League Baseball owners
Major League Baseball team presidents
People from Brooklyn 
People from Freeport, New York 
Boston Red Sox executives
Boston Red Sox owners